Breheny is a surname. Notable people with the surname include:

 Jack Breheny (1910–2009), Australian politician
 Martin Breheny, Irish journalist and sportswriter
 Michael Breheny (1948–2003), English professor of planning
 Tommy Breheny (born 1967/1968), Gaelic football manager